The 1958 San Francisco State Gators football team represented San Francisco State College—now known as San Francisco State University—as a member of the Far Western Conference (FWC) during the 1958 NCAA College Division football season. Led by ninth-year head coach Joe Verducci, San Francisco State compiled an overall record of 7–3 with a mark of 4–1 in conference play, winning the FWC title for the third consecutive season. For the season the team outscored its opponents 184 to 146. The Gators played home games at Cox Stadium in San Francisco.

Schedule

Team players in the NFL
The following San Francisco State players were selected in the 1959 NFL Draft.

Notes

References

San Francisco State
San Francisco State Gators football seasons
Northern California Athletic Conference football champion seasons
San Francisco State Gators football